William Bland (5 November 1789 – 21 July 1868) was a transported convict, medical practitioner and surgeon, politician, farmer and inventor in the Colony of New South Wales, Australia.

Early life
Bland was born in London on 5 November 1789. He was the second of Robert Bland, an obstetrician who wrote for Rees's Cyclopædia. His grandfather Robert Bland was an attorney-at-law at King's Lynn. The identity of Bland's mother is uncertain. He had at least three siblings, an older brother and two sisters. His brother Robert was a clergyman, poet and teacher at Harrow School, while his sister Sophia married John Benjamin Heath, a governor of the Bank of England.

Bland was likely educated at a public school, possibly at the Merchant Taylors' School, Northwood. He followed his father into the medical profession and possibly served as his apprentice. In January 1809, he qualified for entry into the Royal Navy's medical service as a "surgeon's mate" after passing the examination conducted by the Royal College of Surgeons of England. He was promoted to naval surgeon in 1812 and was stationed aboard  on the East Indies Station.

Murder conviction
On 7 April 1813, Bland shot and killed Robert Case, the ship's purser on Hesper, in a duel on Cross Island in Bombay Harbour. The duel stemmed from a disagreement between Case and William Randall, the ship's first lieutenant. According to contemporary accounts in the Bombay Courier, Case initially challenged Randall to a duel, which Bland tried to prevent. A few days later, Case continued to make remarks about Randall, who was absent, and was defended by Bland. Case then called Bland a "contemptible fellow", to which Bland responded by throwing a drinking glass at him; Case subsequently challenged Bland to a duel with pistols.

Bland and the three other surviving participants in the duel were charged with "wilful murder" and gaoled by the Recorder's Court of the Bombay Presidency. Only he and Randall – who had served as his second – were brought to trial. Bland mounted a defence of honour, stating that to refuse Case's challenge would have "doomed me to a punishment worse than death" and that he had no intention of actually killing the man. The Recorder did not accept the argument, finding that the killing was premeditated and advising the jury to find the defendants guilty. The jury accepted the instruction but recommended mercy. Both defendants were given sentences of transportation; Bland received the minimum sentence of seven years while Randall was given eight years as he was judged to have played a greater part in the circumstances surrounding the duel.

Australia
Bland arrived in Hobart as a convict in January 1814, travelling with his co-offender Randall. Despite their status as criminals, they were invited to dine with senior army officers and invited to Government House by Lieutenant-Governor Thomas Davey, of whom Bland stated that he was "fortunate enough to obtain the steady and firm friendship". An account of Davey's actions was passed on to Lachlan Macquarie, the newly appointed governor of New South Wales, who stated that he had committed a "very great irregularity" in receiving the convicts.

In June 1814, Bland was sent on to Sydney. He was almost immediately granted his freedom by Macquarie and in September 1814 was appointed as the medical superintendent of the colony's lunatic asylum at Castle Hill. He was also granted some nearby government land for his own use. The appointment of convicts to government positions was not uncommon at the time due to a shortage of qualified individuals; the colony's principal surgeon D'Arcy Wentworth and assistant surgeon William Redfern were also ex-convicts. Bland received a full pardon on 27 January 1815.

In 1818 he wrote "pipes" (anonymous and variously insulting satires) criticising Governor Macquarie's treatment of farmers, and making fun of his desire to have his name on foundation stones; the Governor was not amused.  Bland's handwriting was recognised and on Thursday 24 and Friday 25 September 1818 he was in court and convicted of libel fined £50/-/-d and sentenced to 12 months imprisonment which he served at Parramatta.

Philanthropy
In 1825 his committee founded Sydney Public Free Grammar School. The foundation stone of a new building was laid by the chief justice in 1830 and the Sydney College opened on 19 January 1835. Bland was treasurer from 1835 to 1844 and in 1845 became president, an office he held when the buildings were sold to the University of Sydney in 1853.

Politics
In 1830 he actively opposed attempts to alienate large areas of crown land, and in 1831 joined the committee of the Australian Landowners Association to fight the Ripon land regulations.

In September 1834 Sir Edward Lytton Bulwer, M.P., wrote from England that the Australian situation was not well understood in London. He suggested that an organised association should be formed, and that it should appoint a parliamentary agent for New South Wales. As a result, the Australian Patriotic Association was formed in 1835 by William Wentworth; Bland was its "chairman of the committee of correspondence" (i.e.: Secretary).

In 1839 he contributed funds and land to the building of St John's Ashfield.

During 1839–1841, Bland wrote letters for Australian Patriotic Association (emancipists), which now show the constitutional struggles towards autonomy. Bland, as secretary ("chairman of the committee of correspondence") to the Australian Patriotic Association, helped draft two bills for a "representative constitution", which was approved in 1842 with Bland representing Sydney at its reading and approval passages.

Bland was an elected member of the NSW Legislative Council twice (1843–1848, 1849–1850) for the City of Sydney and after the introduction of responsible government was appointed to the NSW Legislative Council (1858–1861).

In 1849 Wentworth introduced a bill into the Legislature to create the University of Sydney, naming Bland as one of its first senators, but Robert Lowe raised Bland's criminal record and the 1813 duel, and the bill failed.  Bland challenged Lowe to a duel but Lowe avoided it.  When the bill was re-introduced Bland's name had been omitted, and the bill was passed, but without the list of nominees, and the proclamation appointing the Senate on 24 December 1850 did not include Bland.

A banquet was held in July 1856 to celebrate the grant of a new Constitution by the British government. Bland accepted an invitation to preside and received a deserved ovation. On 5 November 1858 he was given a sum of money and a candelabrum for his services to the community. He resigned on 21 March 1861 and an ensuing attempt to procure an annuity for him was defeated in the Legislative Council. In 1861 he was declared a bankrupt.

Other activities and later life
In approximately 1845, he was the subject of the oldest surviving photograph taken in Australia, held by the Mitchell Library, State Library of New South Wales.

In February 1846, Bland, then a widower, married a widow, Eliza Smeathman.

Bland continued in active medical practice until 1868. In 1863-4 he conducted correspondence with Father Therry on the best way to construct a transatlantic telegraph cable.

He died intestate in Sydney on 21 July 1868 of pneumonia, and was accorded a State Funeral.

Personal life
In April 1817, Bland married Sarah Henry, the 20-year-old daughter of William Henry of the London Missionary Society. Henry had previously lived in Tahiti, where her father was a missionary, and was sent to Sydney after falling in love with a Tahitian chief. She was later engaged to Thomas Hassall, the son of another missionary, before beginning a relationship with Bland. Their wedding at St Philip's Church was officiated by William Cowper.

Only a few months into his first marriage, Bland discovered that his wife had committed adultery with Richard Drake, an East India Company officer. He initially sought a duel with Drake, who went into hiding and eventually fled the colony. He then sued Drake for "criminal conversation" and was awarded damages of £2,000, although he likely never received any money. Bland placed an advertisement in the Sydney Gazette "cautioning the public" against extending any credit to his wife. They remained legally married after their separation and he provided maintenance of £50 per year until her death in England in about 1840.

After separating from his first wife, Bland lived in a two-storey house in Pitt Street, retaining several convict servants and occasionally taking on boarders. He had a collection of pets which included a spaniel, a one-eyed magpie, a cockatoo and several snakes. In February 1846, Bland married Eliza Smeathman, the widow of his close friend Charles Smeathman who had frequently acted as coroner.

Legacy

Bland County, New South Wales was named in his honour.

An electoral division in the first federal parliament, the Division of Bland, was named after him. This division was abolished in 1906.

Bland is also commemorated in the name of Bland Shire Council and Bland Street in suburban Ashfield and Haberfield where he purchased land in 1839. Bland Street and the Bland Oak in Oakdene Park, Carramar, New South Wales are located what was known as the Mark Lodge estate, acquired by Bland in 1840.

In honour of Dr William Bland's contribution to medical practice within early Australia, a twelve level building opposite Sydney Hospital at 229–231 Macquarie Street, Sydney was built in 1960 and named the William Bland Centre. It predominantly houses private medical practices such as Physiotherapy Clinic mySydneyPhysio, addressing the health needs of Sydney's CBD workforce.

A public housing building, Blandville Court, on Victoria Road at Gladesville is named after the early name of the nearby suburb of Henley, which was originally called Blandville after Bland.

See also
 List of convicts transported to Australia
 Photography in Australia

References

Further reading

A. M. McIntosh, "The Life and Times of William Bland", Bulletin of the Post-Graduate Committee in Medicine, University of Sydney, vol 10, no 6, Sept 1954, pp 109–52; P. Thompson, William Bland (draft M.A. thesis, Australian National University, 1964).

External links

 William Bland biography (with picture)
 Designs for Bland's atomic ship – State Library of NSW
 Shades of Light  (Australian Photography 1839 – 1988) the online version of the original Shades of Light published 1998, Gael Newton, National Gallery of Australia.
Australian History, volume 2 published by Grollier Society, Sydney 1956
 
 Colonial Secretary's papers 1822-1877, State Library of Queensland- includes digitised correspondence and letters written by Bland to the Colonial Secretary of New South Wales

1789 births
1868 deaths
19th-century Australian medical doctors
Convicts transported to Australia
Recipients of British royal pardons
Members of the New South Wales Legislative Council
19th-century Australian politicians
Australian duellists
British duellists
British people convicted of murder